The 22981/22982 Kota - Shri Ganganagar Superfast Express is a superfast train belonging to West Central Railway zone that runs between Kota Junction and Shri Ganganagar Junction in India.

It is currently being operated with 22981/22982 train numbers on four days a week basis.

Coach composition

The train has standard LHB rakes with max speed of 110 kmph. The train consists of 21 coaches :

 1 AC II Tier
 6 AC III Tier
 8 Sleeper Coaches
 4 General Unreserved
 2 End-on Generator

Service

The 22981/Kota - Shri Ganganagar Superfast Express has an average speed of 55 km/hr and covers 917 km in 16 hrs 35 mins.

The 22982/Shri Ganganagar - Kota Superfast Express has an average speed of 56 km/hr and covers 917 km in 16 hrs 15 mins.

Route and halt 

The important halts of the train are:

Schedule

Direction reversal

The train reverses its direction at:

Rake sharing

The train shares its rake with 22997/22998 Jhalawar City - Shri Ganganagar Superfast Express.

Traction

Both trains are hauled by a Bhagat Ki Kothi Diesel Loco Shed based WDP-4B diesel locomotive from Shri Ganganagar to Kota and vice versa.

Notes

See also

 Shri Ganganagar Junction railway station
 Kota Junction railway station

References

External links
 22981/Kota - Shri Ganganagar Superfast Express
 22982/Shri Ganganagar - Kota Superfast Express

Transport in Kota, Rajasthan
Transport in Sri Ganganagar
Express trains in India
Rail transport in Rajasthan
Railway services introduced in 2013